The rivière du Moulin (in English: Mill River) is a tributary of the east bank of the Chaudière River, which flows northward to empty on the south bank of the St. Lawrence River.

Toponymy 
The toponym Rivière du Moulin was made official on December 5, 1968, at the Commission de toponymie du Québec.

See also 

 List of rivers of Quebec

References 

Rivers of Chaudière-Appalaches
Beauce-Sartigan Regional County Municipality